Rock, Pretty Baby is a 1956 American comedy musical film directed by Richard Bartlett and starring Sal Mineo, John Saxon and Luana Patten.

Plot
Young musician Jimmy Daley (Saxon) needs to come up with $300 to purchase the electric guitar he wants. He pawns his law books, to the disappointment of his father (Platt), a doctor whose goal is for Jimmy to become a lawyer.

Jimmy's jealous nature results in a ruckus at a party and $150 in damage to a neighbor, which Dr. Daley  insists his son pay. His girlfriend Joan Wright (Patten) learns that a battle of the bands has a cash prize. Jimmy and his group end up losing the contest, but he earns the respect of his dad.

Cast
 Sal Mineo as Angelo Barrato
 John Saxon as Jimmy Daley
 Luana Patten as Joan Wright
 Edward C. Platt as Thomas Daley Sr. M.D.
 Fay Wray as Beth Daley
 Rod McKuen as 'Ox' Bentley
 John Wilder as 'Fingers' Porter 
 Alan Reed Jr. as 'Sax' Lewis 
 Douglas Fowley as 'Pop' Wright
 Bob Courtney as 'Half-Note' Harris
 Shelley Fabares as Twinky Daley
 Susan Volkmann as Carol Saunders
 Caryl Volkmann as Claire Saunders
 April Kent as Kay Norton
 Sue George as Lori Parker
 Walter Reed as Mr. Reid
 Glen Kramer as Bruce Carter 
 Johnny Grant as Johnny Grant
 George Winslow as Thomas Daley, III

Production
The film was announced in June 1956, under the title Crazy Love.

Luana Patten had been a child actor then stopped working at age 14 to concentrate on school. After several years she told her agent she wanted to act again and she was cast in Rock Pretty Baby. She signed at $650 a week. The contract had options for another seven years. Universal tried to exercise it and Patten sued to get out of it.

Filming started July 1956. It was also known as The Living End before being titled Rock Pretty Baby.

Before the film came out, Al Daff of Universal said the movie "is not an important picture but it will gross more than many multi million dollar pictures."

Release
Sal Mineo and John Saxon were sent out on a promotional tour on the launch of the film.

Universal signed George Winslow to a two picture a year deal over five years on the basis of his performance in the movie.

Variety said it "should emerge a box office winner."

Filmink called it "a jaunty, energetic teen film, with a surprisingly hot late-night beach kissing scene between Saxon and co-star Luana Patten. It became a sleeper hit for Universal."

Sequel
In May 1957 Universal announced they would make a sequel Summer Love.

See also
List of American films of 1956

References

External links

Rock, Pretty Baby at TCMDB

1956 films
1956 musical comedy films
American musical comedy films
American black-and-white films
Films directed by Richard Bartlett
Films scored by Henry Mancini
Universal Pictures films
1950s English-language films
1950s American films